Aashiq is a 2001 Indian Hindi action romance film directed by Indra Kumar. The film stars Bobby Deol and Karisma Kapoor in the lead. It is a remake of Telugu movie Gulabi. 

The film premiered on 26 January 2001 in Mumbai. Aashiq was declared "flop" by Box Office India.

Plot

Chander helps his friend marry his lover named Sapna  against Sapna's brother, Mathur, who is a suspended police officer. Sapna's friend Pooja is with Sapna when Chander helps Sapna run away from home. From that moment, Pooja falls madly in love with Chander. Sapna and Chander's friend get married. This enrages Sapna's brother, who harbors a grudge against Chander and tries to arrest him at any opportunity.

Pooja lives in a big house with unloving parents. Every time her parents met, they argued and fought. Pooja begins calling Chander anonymously on the phone and calls herself "dream girl", and flirts with him, making him happy and curious to find out who she is. Chander's father is an advocate and loves his only son since only two of them live together in their house, hence their relationship was really good. Chander's father helped him to find out who was "dream girl" by tricking her into coming to the wedding of another man named Chander. Chander was happy when he learned that the dream girl is Pooja; from then on, they start dating.

When Pooja's parents learn about their relationship, they don't approve and force Pooja to get engaged to somebody else. Chander finds out about her wedding arrangements and goes to her house to speak to her father, who starts to abuse Chander and physically assault him, which leads to Chander striking back at him when Pooja arrives. This leads to a misunderstanding between Pooja and Chander that causes them to have a fallout, and Chander returns to his home where Pooja calls him to tell him that she learned the truth and wants to meet him. However, Chander is enraged and does not want to speak to her. Then Chander's childhood friend Jai takes the call for him and asks her to meet him at a deserted area with Chander, to which she agrees.

After Pooja and Jai meet, a gang of men abducts Pooja as per Jai's instructions, who tricked her and revealed to have sold her to one of the city's most feared pimps, Baburao. As time passes, Chander misses Pooja after recalling the moments they had on her birthday and decides to go meet her but is intercepted by Mathur and a squad of policemen and is then taken to the police station for interrogation where Pooja's father reveals that she has been missing for two days. Mathur and his officers try to assault Chander, but he fights back and escapes from the police station. After that, Chander starts searching for Pooja and meets his friend Jai who tells him that he can help him to find her.

Jai contacts Mathur and tries to set up Chander to get him arrested in a dance bar. Chander figures out the set up in the dance bar after he sees an earring that he had given to Pooja in Jai's glass, but Jai manages to escape. Jai goes to the police station and requests inspector Mathur for protection and offers his help in apprehending Chander. They send Mathur's informer, Badru, to give Chander the wrong information about Jai's whereabouts. Chander goes there where it is very dark and kicks Jai down from behind. It turns out to be Mathur in Jai's clothes who reveals to him that Jai is safe in his informer Badru's house. Chander is surrounded by many policemen, but as Mathur knocks off his hat, it turns out to be his friend instead, who was disguised as Chander wearing tall boots and a tape recorder with Chander's voice. He reveals that Chander now knows where Jai really is from a phone which he had with him. Chander eventually finds Jai and beats him out in the street, and makes Jai take him to the brothel where he sold her. However, Chander gets involved in a fight with Baburau's men outside the brothel and gets stabbed by one of them.

It is shown that an Arabic man from Dubai had agreed to purchase Pooja for 50 lakh rupees and wants to take her with him to Dubai. Meanwhile, Chander is injured seriously after being stabbed and is being treated by his father and friends in Sapna's house, when Badru finds out about it, he informs inspector Mathur about it. When Mathur goes along with his constable Bawander Singh and other policemen to apprehend Chander, he learns that Chander escaped after Bawander Singh had tipped Chander's friends about the raid, which infuriates Mathur and leads to Bawander resigning from the job due to Mathur's partiality towards his job duties and personal vendetta against Chander.

Chander later finds out that Pooja had been taken by the Arabic man and goes to the airport to save her, where she is almost boarding the plane. However, Chander met Baburao, who gives him a chance to fight him and take Pooja away. After he beats Baburao in a hard-fought battle, he turns his attention towards Jai when Baburao gets up and tries to shoot Chander, Chander moves away, and the bullet hits Jai's forehead instead and kills him. Baburao tries to shoot Chander once again but is shot from behind by inspector Mathur who seemingly helped Chander and is met with a sincere salute from his constable, Bawander Singh. The movie ends with Pooja and Chander embracing each other.

Cast
Bobby Deol as Chander "Chandu" Kapoor
Karishma Kapoor as Pooja Singh
Nasirr Khan as Jai, Chandu's friend.
Rahul Dev as Baburao, the brothel's owner.
Smita Jaykar as Mrs. Singh, Pooja's mother.
Anupam Kher as Dilip Dev Kapoor
Mrinal Kulkarni as Sapna Devi
Anjan Srivastav as Mr. Singh, Pooja's father.
Johnny Lever as Pranat, the dwarfism.
Dina Pathak as Dai Maa
Mukesh Rishi as Sapna's brother
Vrajesh Hirjee as Chandu's friend
Ashok Saraf as Police Constable 
Kashmira Shah

Soundtrack
Lyrics: Sameer

Box office

References

External links
 

2000s Hindi-language films
2001 films
2000s romantic thriller films
Indian romantic action films
Hindi remakes of Telugu films
Films directed by Indra Kumar
Films scored by Sanjeev Darshan
Films distributed by Yash Raj Films
Indian romantic thriller films
Films about human trafficking in India
2000s romantic action films